Phaius flavus is a species of orchid in the genus Phaius described by John Lindley in 1831. It is widespread across much of Asia (China, Japan, India, Thailand, Indonesia, the Philippines, etc.) as well as New Guinea, New Caledonia, Samoa and Vanuatu.

References

flavus
Plants described in 1831
Orchids of Asia
Orchids of New Guinea